The hippopotamus or hippo (: hippos, hippopotamuses or hippopotami; Hippopotamus amphibius), further qualified as the common hippopotamus, Nile hippopotamus, or river hippopotamus, is a large semiaquatic mammal native to sub-Saharan Africa. It is one of only two extant species in the family Hippopotamidae, the other being the pygmy hippopotamus (Choeropsis liberiensis or Hexaprotodon liberiensis). Its name comes from the ancient Greek for "river horse".

After elephants and rhinos, the hippopotamus is the next  largest land mammal. It is also the largest extant land artiodactyl. Despite their physical resemblance to pigs and other terrestrial even-toed ungulates, the closest living relatives of the hippopotamids are cetaceans (whales, dolphins, porpoises, etc.), from which they diverged about 55 million years ago. Despite its stocky shape and short legs, it is capable of running  over short distances.

Hippos inhabit rivers, lakes, and mangrove swamps. Territorial bulls each preside over a stretch of water and a group of five to thirty cows and calves. Mating and birth both occur in the water. During the day, hippos remain cool by staying in water or mud, emerging at dusk to graze on grasses. While hippos rest near each other in the water, grazing is a solitary activity and hippos typically do not display territorial behaviour on land. Hippos are among the most dangerous animals in the world due to their aggressive and unpredictable nature. They are threatened by habitat loss and poaching for their meat and ivory (canine teeth).

Etymology
In English, the plural is "hippopotamuses", but "hippopotami" is also used.

Taxonomy and origins

Classification
The modern hippopotamus and the pygmy hippopotamus are the only living members of the family Hippopotamidae. Some taxonomists place hippos and anthracotheres in the superfamily Anthracotheroidea. Hippopotamidae are classified along with other even-toed ungulates in the order Artiodactyla.

Five subspecies of hippos have been described based on morphological differences in their skulls as well as differences in geographical range:
H. a. amphibius – (the nominate subspecies) ranges from Gambia east to Ethiopia and then south to Mozambique and historically ranged as far north as Egypt; its skull is distinguished by a moderately reduced preorbital region, a bulging dorsal surface, elongated mandibular symphysis and larger chewing teeth.
H. a. kiboko – found in Kenya and Somalia; was noted to be smaller and more lightly coloured than other hippos with wider nostrils, somewhat longer snout and more rounded and relatively raised orbits with the space between them being incurved.
H. a. capensis – found in Zambia and South Africa; distinguished by wider orbits.
H. a. tschadensis – ranges between Chad and Niger; featured a slightly shorter but broader face, and pronounced, forward-facing orbits.
H. a. constrictus – ranged from the southern Democratic Republic of Congo to Angola and Namibia; skull characterised by a thicker preorbital region, shorter snout, flatter dorsal surface, reduced mandibular symphysis and smaller chewing teeth.
The suggested subspecies above were never widely used or validated by field biologists; the described morphological differences were small enough that they could have resulted from simple variation in nonrepresentative samples. A study examining mitochondrial DNA from skin biopsies taken from 13 sampling locations found "low, but significant, genetic differentiation" among H. a. amphibius, H. a. capensis, and H. a. kiboko. Neither H. a. tschadensis nor H. a. constrictus have been tested.

Evolution

Until 1909, naturalists classified hippos together with pigs based on molar patterns. Several lines of evidence, first from blood proteins, then from molecular systematics and DNA and the fossil record, show their closest living relatives are cetaceans (whales, dolphins, and porpoises). The common ancestor of hippos and whales branched off from Ruminantia and the rest of the even-toed ungulates; the cetacean and hippo lineages split soon afterwards.

This group eventually underwent aquatic adaptation into the completely aquatic cetaceans. The other branch became the anthracotheres, a large family of four-legged beasts, the earliest of which in the late Eocene would have resembled skinny hippos with comparatively smaller, narrower heads. All branches of the anthracotheres, except that which evolved into Hippopotamidae, became extinct during the Pliocene, leaving no descendants.

A rough evolutionary lineage of the hippo can thus be traced from Eocene and Oligocene species: from Anthracotherium and Elomeryx to the Miocene species Merycopotamus and Libycosaurus and finally the very latest anthracotheres in the Pliocene. These groups lived across Eurasia and Africa. Hippopotamid species would spread across Africa and Eurasia, including the modern pygmy hippo. The oldest remains of H. amphibius are known from Africa, and date to the Early Pleistocene, approximately 2 million years ago.

Extinct species
Three species of Malagasy hippopotamus became extinct during the Holocene on Madagascar, the last of them within the past 1,000 years. The Malagasy hippos were smaller than the modern hippo, a likely result of the process of insular dwarfism. Fossil evidence indicates many Malagasy hippos were hunted by humans, a factor in their eventual extinction. Isolated individual Malagasy hippos may have survived in remote pockets; in 1976, villagers described a living animal called the kilopilopitsofy, which may have been a Malagasy hippo.

An extinct species, Hippopotamus antiquus, ranged throughout Europe, extending as far north as Britain during the Early and Middle Pleistocene epochs, before being replaced by the modern H. amphibius during the latter part of the Middle Pleistocene. The Pleistocene also saw a number of dwarf species evolve on several Mediterranean islands, including Crete (Hippopotamus creutzburgi), Cyprus (the Cyprus dwarf hippopotamus, Hippopotamus minor), Malta (Hippopotamus melitensis), and Sicily (Hippopotamus pentlandi). Of these, the Cyprus dwarf hippo survived until the end of the Pleistocene or early Holocene. Evidence from the archaeological site Aetokremnos continues to cause debate on whether or not the species was driven to extinction, or even encountered, by man.

Characteristics and adaptations

The hippopotamus is a megaherbivore and is exceeded in size among land animals only by elephants and some rhinoceros species. Exceptionally large males have been recorded reaching . Male hippos appear to continue growing throughout their lives, while females reach maximum weight at around age 25.

Hippos have barrel-shaped bodies with short tails and legs, and an hourglass-shaped skull with a long snout. Their skeletal structures are graviportal, adapted to carrying their enormous weight, and their dense bones and low centre of gravity allows them to sink and move along the bottom of the water. Hippopotamuses have small legs (relative to other megafauna) because the water in which they live reduces the weight burden. The pelvis rests at an angle of 45 degrees. Hippos usually trot to move quickly on land and can gallop at  when needed. They are incapable of jumping but can walk up steep banks. Despite their rounded appearance, hippos have little fat.

The eyes, ears, and nostrils of hippos are placed high on the roof of their skulls. This allows these organs to remain above the surface while the rest of the body is submerged. The nostrils and ears can close when underwater while nictitating membranes cover the eyes. Despite being semiaquatic and having webbed feet, an adult hippo is not a particularly good swimmer, nor can it float. It rarely enters deep water; when does, the animal moves by bouncing off the bottom. An adult hippo surfaces every four to six minutes, while young need to breathe every two to three minutes. The hippopotamus sleeps with both hemispheres of the brain resting, as in all land mammals, and usually sleeps on land or in water with the nostrils exposed. Despite this, it may be capable of sleeping while submerged, intermittently surfacing to breathe without waking. They appear to transition between different phases of sleep more quickly than other mammals.

The hippo's jaw is powered by huge masseter and digastric muscles which give them large, droopy cheeks. The jaw hinge allows the animal to open its mouth at almost 180°. A folded orbicularis oris muscle allows the hippo to attain an extreme gape without tearing any tissue. The lower canines are sharpened through contact with the smaller upper canines. The canines and incisors are used mainly for combat instead of feeding. Hippos rely on their flattened, horny lips to grasp and pull grasses which are then ground by the molars. The hippo is considered to be a pseudoruminant; it has a complex three-chambered stomach, but does not "chew cud".

The animal is mostly purplish-grey or blue-black, but brownish-pink on the underside and around the eyes and ears. Their skin secretes a natural, red-coloured sunscreen substance that is sometimes referred to as "blood sweat" but is neither blood nor sweat. This secretion is initially colourless and turns red-orange within minutes, eventually becoming brown. Two highly acidic pigments have been identified in the secretions; one red (hipposudoric acid) and one orange (norhipposudoric acid), which inhibit the growth of disease-causing bacteria and their light-absorption profile peaks in the ultraviolet range, creating a sunscreen effect. Regardless of diet, all hippos secrete these pigments so food does not appear to be their source; rather, they may be synthesised from precursors such as the amino acid tyrosine. This natural sunscreen cannot prevent the animal's skin from cracking if it stays out of water too long.

The testes of the males do not fully descend and a scrotum is not present. In addition, the penis retracts into the body when not erect. The genitals of the female hippos are unusual in that the vagina is ridged and the vulval vestibule has two large, protruding diverticula. Both of these have an unknown function.

A hippo's lifespan is typically 40 to 50 years. Donna the Hippo was one of the oldest living hippos in captivity. She lived at the Mesker Park Zoo in Evansville, Indiana, in the US until her death in 2012 at the age of 61. The oldest hippo ever recorded was called Bertha; she had lived in the Manila Zoo in the Philippines since it first opened in 1959. When she died in 2017, her age was estimated to be 65.

Distribution and status

During the late Middle Pleistocene and Late Pleistocene (~300,000-40,000 years ago) Hippopotamus amphibius was present in Europe, extending as far north as England during the Eemian (130-115,000 years ago). Archaeological evidence exists of its presence in the Levant, dating to less than 3,000 years ago. The species was common in Egypt's Nile region during antiquity, but it has since been driven out. According to Pliny the Elder, in his time, the best location in Egypt for capturing this animal was in the Saite nome; the animal could still be found along the Damietta branch of the Nile after the Arab Conquest in 639. Reports of the slaughter of the last hippo in Natal Province were made at the end of the 19th century. Hippos are still found in the rivers and lakes of the northern Democratic Republic of the Congo, Uganda, Tanzania, and Kenya, north through to Ethiopia, Somalia, and Sudan, west to The Gambia, and south to South Africa.

Genetic evidence suggests common hippos in Africa experienced a marked population expansion during or after the Pleistocene, attributed to an increase in water bodies at the end of the era. These findings have important conservation implications, as hippo populations across the continent are currently threatened by loss of access to fresh water. Hippos are also subject to unregulated hunting and poaching. The species is included in Appendix II of the Convention on International Trade in Endangered Species (CITES) meaning international export/import (including in parts and derivatives) requires CITES documentation to be obtained and presented to border authorities.

As of 2017, the IUCN Red List drawn up by the International Union for Conservation of Nature (IUCN) lists the species as vulnerable, with a stable population estimated between 115,000 and 130,000 animals. The hippo population has declined most dramatically in the Democratic Republic of the Congo. By 2005, the population in Virunga National Park had dropped to 800 or 900 from around 29,000 in the mid-1970s. This decline is attributed to the disruptions caused by the Second Congo War. The poachers are believed to be Mai-Mai rebels, underpaid Congolese soldiers, and local militia groups. Reasons for poaching include the belief hippos are harmful to society, as well as financial gain. As of 2016, the Virunga hippo population appears to have increased again, possibly due to better protection from park rangers, who have worked with local fishermen. The sale of hippo meat is illegal, but black-market sales are difficult for Virunga National Park officers to track. Hippo meat is highly valued in some areas of central Africa and the teeth may be used as a replacement for elephant ivory.

A population of hippos exists in Colombia, descended from captive individuals that escaped from Pablo Escobar's estate after his death in 1993. Their numbers grew to 100 by the 2020s and ecologists believe the population should be eradicated, as they are breeding rapidly and are an increasing menace to humans and the environment. Attempts to control them include sterilisation and culling.

Behaviour and ecology

Hippos are semiaquatic and require enough water to immerse in, while being close to grass. They prefer relatively still waters with gently sloping shores, though male hippos may also be found in very small numbers in more rapid waters with rocky slopes. Hippos mostly live in freshwater habitat, but can be found in estuaries.

Hippos spend most the day in water to stay cool and hydrated. Just before night begins, they leave the water to foraging on land. Like most herbivores, hippos will consume a variety of plants if presented with them in captivity, but their diet in nature consists almost entirely of grass, with only minimal consumption of aquatic plants. By dawn, they are back in the water. On occasion, hippos have been filmed eating carrion, usually near the water. There are other reports of meat-eating and even cannibalism and predation. The stomach anatomy of lacks adaptions to carnivory, and meat-eating is likely caused by lack of nutrients or just an abnormal behaviour.

Because of their size and their habit of taking the same paths to feed, hippos can have a significant impact on the land across which they walk, keeping the land clear of vegetation and depressing the ground. Over prolonged periods, hippos can divert the paths of swamps and channels. By defecating in the water, the animals also appear to pass on microbes from their gut, affecting the biogeochemical cycle.

Social interaction

It is challenging to study the interaction of bulls and cows because hippos are not sexually dimorphic, so cows and young bulls are almost indistinguishable in the field. Hippo pods fluctuate but can contain over 100 hippos. Although they lie close together, adults develop almost no social bonds. Territories are abandoned when the water dries up. The bull has breeding access to all the cows in his territory. Younger bachelors are allowed to stay as long as they defer to him. A younger male may challenge the old bull for control of the territory. Within the pods, the hippos tend to segregate by sex and status. Bachelor males lounge near other bachelors, females with other females, and the territorial male is on his own. When hippos emerge from the water to graze, they do so individually.

Hippos engage in "muck-spreading" which involves defecating while spinning their tails to distribute the faeces over a greater area. Muck-spreading occurs both on land and in water and its function is not well understood. It is unlikely to server to territorial, as the animals only establish territories in the water. They may be used as trails between the water and grazing areas. "Yawning" serves as a threat display. When fighting, bulls use their incisors to block each other's attacks and their large canines as offensive weapons. When hippos become over-populated or a habitat shrinks, bulls sometimes attempt infanticide, but this behaviour is not common under normal conditions.

The most common hippo vocalisation is the "wheeze honk", which can travel over long distances in air. This call starts as a high-pitched squeal followed by a deeper, resonant call. The animals can recognise the calls of other individuals. Hippos are more likely to react to the wheeze honks of strangers than those they are more familiar with. When threatened or alarmed, they produce exhalations, and fighting bulls will bellow loudly. Hippos are recorded to produce clicks underwater which may have echolocative properties. They have the unique ability to hold their heads partially above the water and send out a cry that travels through both water and air; individuals respond both above and below water.

Reproduction

Cows reach sexual maturity at five to six years of age and have a gestation period of eight months. A study of endocrine systems revealed cows may begin puberty at as early as three or four years. Males reach maturity at around 7.5 years. Both conceptions and births are highest during the wet season. Male hippo always have mobile spermatozoa and can breed year-round. After becoming pregnant, a female hippo will typically not begin ovulation again for 17 months.

Hippos mate in the water, with the cow remaining under the surface, her head emerging periodically to draw breath. Cows  give birth in seclusion and return within 10 to 14 days. The female lies on her side when nursing, which can occur underwater or on land. The young are carried on their mothers' backs in deep water.

Mother hippos are very protective of their young, not allowing others to get too close. One cow was recorded protecting a calf's carcass after it had died. Calves may be temporarily kept in nurseries, guarded by one or more adults, and will play amongst themselves. Like many other large mammals, hippos are described as K-strategists, in this case typically producing just one large, well-developed infant every couple of years (rather than many small, poorly developed young several times per year, as is common among small mammals such as rodents). Calves no longer need to suckle when they are a year old.

Interspecies interactions

Hippos coexist alongside a variety of large predators in their habitats. Nile crocodiles, lions, and spotted hyenas are known to prey on young hippos. Beyond these, adult hippos are not usually preyed upon by other animals due to their aggression and size. Cases where large lion prides have successfully preyed on adult hippos have been reported, but it is generally rare. Lions occasionally prey on adults at Gorongosa National Park and calves are sometimes taken at Virunga. Crocodiles are frequent targets of hippo aggression, probably because they often inhabit the same riparian habitats; crocodiles may be either aggressively displaced or killed by hippos. In turn, very large Nile crocodiles have been observed preying occasionally on calves, "half-grown" hippos, and possibly also adult female hippos. Groups of crocodiles have also been observed finishing off still-living male hippos that were previously injured in mating battles with other males.

Hippos occasionally visit cleaning stations in order to be cleaned of parasites by certain species of fishes. They signal their readiness for this service by opening their mouths wide. This is an example of mutualism, in which the hippo benefits from the cleaning while the fish receive food. Hippo defecation creates allochthonous deposits of organic matter along the river beds. These deposits have an unclear ecological function. A 2015 study concluded hippo dung provides nutrients from terrestrial material for fish and aquatic invertebrates, while a 2018 study found that their dung can be toxic to aquatic life in large quantities, due to absorption of dissolved oxygen in water bodies.

The parasitic monogenean flatworm Oculotrema hippopotami infests hippopotamus eyes, mainly the nictitating membrane. It is the only monogenean species (which normally live on fish) documented to live on a mammal.

Hippos and humans

The earliest evidence of human interaction with hippos comes from butchery cut marks on hippo bones found at the Bouri Formation and dated to around 160,000 years ago. 4,000–5,000 year art showing hippos being hunted have been found in the Tassili n'Ajjer Mountains of the central Sahara near Djanet. The ancient Egyptians recognised the hippo as a ferocious denizen of the Nile and representations on the tombs of nobles show the animals were hunted by humans.

The hippo was also known to the Greeks and Romans. The Greek historian Herodotus described the hippo in The Histories (written circa 440 BC) and the Roman naturalist Pliny the Elder wrote about the hippo in his encyclopedia Naturalis Historia (written circa 77 AD). The Yoruba people called the hippo erinmi, which means "elephant of the water". Some individual hippos have achieved international fame. Huberta became a celebrity during the Great Depression for trekking a great distance across South Africa.

Attacks on humans
The hippo is considered to be extremely aggressive and has frequently been reported charging and attacking boats. Small boats can easily be capsized by hippos and passengers can be injured or killed by the animals, or drown in the water. In one 2014 case in Niger, a boat was capsized by a hippo and 13 people were killed. Hippos will often raid farm crops if the opportunity arises, and humans may come into conflict with them on these occasions. These encounters can be fatal to either humans or hippos.

In zoos

Hippos have long been popular zoo animals. The first record of hippos taken into captivity for display is dated to 3500 BC in Hierakonpolis, Egypt. The first zoo hippo in modern history was Obaysch, who arrived at the London Zoo on 25 May 1850, where he attracted up to 10,000 visitors a day and inspired a popular song, the "Hippopotamus Polka".

Hippos generally breed well in captivity; birth rates are lower than in the wild, but this can be attributed to zoos' desire to limit births, since hippos are relatively expensive to maintain. Starting in 2015, the Cincinnati Zoo built a US$73 million exhibit to house three adult hippos, featuring a  tank. In 1987, the Toledo Zoo saw the first underwater birth by a captive hippo. The exhibit was so popular, the logo of the Toledo Zoo was updated to feature the hippos.

Cultural significance

In Egyptian mythology, the god Set takes the form of a red hippopotamus and fights Horus for control of the land, but is defeated. The goddess Tawaret is depicted as a pregnant woman with a hippo head, representing fierce maternal love. The Ijaw people of the Niger Delta wore masks of aquatic animals like the hippo when practising their water spirit cults, and hippo ivory was used in the divination rituals of the Yoruba. Hippo masks were also used in Nyau funerary rituals of the Chewa of Southern Africa. According to Robert Baden-Powell, Zulu warriors referred to hippos in war chants. The Behemoth from the Book of Job, 40:15–24 is thought to be based on the hippo.

Hippos have been the subjects of various African folktales. According to a San story, when the Creator assigned each animal its place in nature, the hippos wanted to live in the water, but were refused out of fear they might eat all the fish. After begging and pleading, the hippos were finally allowed to live in the water on the condition they would eat grass instead of fish, and fling their dung so it can be inspected for fish bones. In a Ndebele tale, the hippo originally had long, beautiful hair, but it was set on fire by a jealous hare and the hippo had to jump into a nearby pool. The hippo lost most of his hair and was too embarrassed to leave the water.

Hippopotamuses were rarely depicted in European art during the Renaissance and Baroque periods, due to less access to specimens by Europeans. One notable exception is Peter Paul Rubens' The Hippopotamus and Crocodile Hunt (1615–1616). Ever since Obaysch inspired the "Hippopotamus Polka", hippos have been popular animals in Western culture for their rotund appearance, which many consider comical. The Disney film Fantasia featured a ballerina hippo dancing to the opera La Gioconda. The film Hugo the Hippo is set in Tanzania and involves the title character trying to escape being slaughtered with the help of local children. The Madagascar films feature a hippo named Gloria. Hippos even inspired a popular board game, Hungry Hungry Hippos.

Among the most famous poems about the hippo is "The Hippopotamus" by T. S. Eliot, where he uses the animal to represent the Catholic Church. Hippos are mentioned in the novelty Christmas song "I Want a Hippopotamus for Christmas" that became a hit for child star Gayla Peevey in 1953. They also featured in the popular "The Hippopotamous Song" by Flanders and Swann.

A popular internet myth reports that hippos have pink milk. Biologist David Wynick states, "I think this is an Internet legend that is oft repeated but without any evidence for it that I can find... Like all mammals, hippos produce white or off-white milk for their young."

See also

 American Hippo bill - 1910 bill that proposed the introduction of hippos into Louisiana 
 Armley Hippo
 Owen and Mzee - hippo and tortoise who bonded
 Fiona - hippo born 6 weeks early at the Cincinnati Zoo and Botanical Garden

References

External links

 

 
Mammals of Africa
Fauna of Sub-Saharan Africa
Herbivorous mammals
Vulnerable animals
Vulnerable biota of Africa
Mammals described in 1758
Articles containing video clips
Taxa named by Carl Linnaeus
Semiaquatic mammals